is a town located in Haibara District, southern Shizuoka Prefecture, Japan. ,  the town had an estimated population of 29,593 in 11359 households, and a population density of 1400 persons per km².

Geography
Yoshida is located on the coastal plains of southwest Shizuoka Prefecture, facing Suruga Bay on the Pacific Ocean. The Ōi River passes to the west of town. Warmed by the Kuroshio Current, the area enjoys a temperate maritime climate with hot, humid summers and mild, cool winters.

Surrounding municipalities
Shizuoka Prefecture
Makinohara
Shimada
Yaizu

Demographics
Per Japanese census data, the population of Yoshida has been increasing over the past 50 years.

Climate
The city has a climate characterized by hot and humid summers, and relatively mild winters (Köppen climate classification Cfa).  The average annual temperature in Yoshida is 16.4 °C. The average annual rainfall is 2151 mm with September as the wettest month. The temperatures are highest on average in August, at around 27.1 °C, and lowest in January, at around 6.3 °C.

History
Located in former Tōtōmi Province, Yokosuka was a castle town in the Sengoku period, with Koyama castle built by the Takeda clan in 1568. The castle was destroyed by Tokugawa Ieyasu in 1582 and never rebuilt, although the town continued to prosper during the Edo period as a regional commercial center due to its proximity to the Tōkaidō highway connecting Edo with Kyoto. With the establishment of the modern municipalities system in the early Meiji period in 1889, the area was reorganized into Yoshida Village from the merger of six pre-Meiji hamlets. It was elevated to town status on April 1, 1889.

Economy
Yoshida has a mixed economy based on agriculture, commercial fishing and light industry. Local specialities include eel, melons and iceberg lettuce. Several industries are located  along the Tōmei Expressway, which passes through the town. These include Fujifilm, AGC Technologies, Sony and Kurita Kogyo.

Education
Yoshida has three public elementary schools and one public junior high school operated by the town government and one public high school operated by the Shizuoka Prefectural Board of Education. The town also has a private high school. The prefecture also operates one special education school for the handicapped.

Transportation

Railway
Yoshida has no passenger railway service.

Highway
  Tōmei Expressway

Sister city relations
Yoshida had formerly established sister city relations with other cities of the same name around Japan. All of these cities have now been merged into other cities and no longer exist as independent municipalities.
Yoshida (Saitama Prefecture) - (Became a sister city in 1995) (Now the city of Chichibu)
Yoshida (Niigata Prefecture) - (Became a sister city in 1995) (Now the city of Tsubame)
Yoshida (Hiroshima Prefecture) - (Became a sister city in 1995) (Now the city of Akitakata)
Yoshida (Ehime Prefecture) - (Became a sister city in 1995) (Now the city of Uwajima)
Yoshida (Kagoshima Prefecture) - (Became a sister city in 1995) (Now the city of Kagoshima)

References

External links

Yoshida official website in Japanese
Kataoka Shrine (Commonly called "Sumiyoshi Shrine")

 
Towns in Shizuoka Prefecture
Populated coastal places in Japan